Boshruyeh ( - "Bosh-Growing", also Romanized as Boshrūyeh) is a city in the Central District of Boshruyeh County, South Khorasan province, Iran, and serves as capital of the county. At the 2006 census, its population was 13,778 in 3,638 households, when it was in the former Boshruyeh District of Ferdows County.

The following census in 2011 counted 15,318 people in 4,325 households, by which time the district had been separated from the county and Boshruyeh County established. The latest census in 2016 showed a population of 16,426 people in 4,973 households.

Boshruyeh is located between the cities of Ferdows and Tabas at the border of the Dasht-e Kavir. Near this city, there are old villages named Aresk, Raqqeh, Korond, Neigenan and Ghaniabad.

The geographic coordinates of Boshruyeh are 33°52' N and 57°25' E. The weather usually is warm and in summer it is very hot. The average rain in a year is less than 150 mm.

History
There are several historic buildings in Boshruyeh and its surroundings. Based on historical books, it seems that this city has been existed at least for 700 years. Some of the most famous buildings are:

1. Qal'eye Dokhtar "Young Woman's Castle": This citadel is located on the top of a mountain in the west of the city. It has been reported that this huge and ancient building was a governmental work from the period of Ismāīlī governance of this region..

2. Hosseynie Haj Ali Ashraf "Haj Ali Ashraf's Hussayniyya": This building has Indian architecture and is used for azadari "religious mourning rites" during the month of Muharram

3. Masjed Mian Deh "Center-City Mosque": This mosque dates back 400 years.

4. Sarāy-e Serke: This ancient and simple house is famous and is also used for azadari.

References 

Boshruyeh County

Cities in South Khorasan Province

Populated places in South Khorasan Province

Populated places in Boshruyeh County